William, Willie, Will, Bill, or Billy Bowman may refer to:

Sportspeople
 Bill Bowman (baseball) (1867–1944), American baseball player for the Chicago Colts
 William Bowman (fencer) (1881–1947), American Olympic fencer
 Bill Bowman (American football) (1931–2008), American football player for the Detroit Lions and Pittsburgh Steelers
 Scotty Bowman or William Scott Bowman (born 1933), Canadian hockey coach
 Bill Bowman (racing driver) (fl. 1950s), NASCAR driver

Other people
 William Bowman Felton (1782–1837), British naval officer and political figure
 William Bowman (Australian politician) (1800–1874)
 William Bowman (miller) (c. 1811 – 1894) pioneer farmer and flour miller of South Australia.
 Sir William Bowman, 1st Baronet (1816–1892), English histologist and ophthalmologist
 William S. Bowman (politician) (1822–1901), American politician and engineer
 William Charles Bowman (c. 1830 – 1879), Australian pastoralist
 Sir William Bowman, 2nd Baronet (1846–1917), English baronet
 William Norman Bowman (1868–1944), American architect based in Denver, Colorado
 William Bowman (director) (1884–1960), American director, actor and writer
 William Ernest Bowman (1911–1985), English engineer and writer
 Beau Dollar or William Hargis Bowman, Jr. (1941–2011), American soul vocalist and drummer
 Bill Bowman (American politician) (1946–2020), member of the North Dakota state senate
 Bill Bowman (Scottish politician) (born 1950), member of the Scottish Parliament

See also
Bowman (disambiguation)